Cocker may refer to:

People
Anne Cocker (1920–2014), Scottish rose breeder from Aberdeen
David Cocker (b. 1955), New Zealand fencer
Edward Cocker (1631–1676), English engraver, who also taught writing and arithmetic
Edwin Cocker (b. 1980), New Zealand rugby union player
Jarvis Cocker (b. 1963), English musician, frontman of Pulp
Joe Cocker (1944–2014), English rock/blues singer
 Cocker, his 1986 album
John Cocker (1815–1885), Anglo-Australian cricketer
Jonny Cocker (b. 1986), British racing driver
Les Cocker (1924–1979), English professional football player and coach
Les Cocker (1939–2017), English professional football player
Linzey Cocker (b. 1987), English actress
Mac Cocker (1941–2016), English-born Australian radio announcer
Mark Cocker (b. 1959), British author and naturalist
Mark Cocker (b. 1982), British freestyle wrestler, Ju-Jitsu and Judo player
Norman Cocker (1889–1953), English organist and composer for the organ
Ryan Cocker (b. 1992), New Zealand rugby union player
Syl Cheney-Cocker (b. 1945), Sierra Leonean poet, novelist, and journalist
W. D. Cocker (1882–1970), Scottish poet

Other 
Abbreviation of Autococker, a paintball marker.
Cocker, one who follows the sport of cockfighting
Cocker Spaniel, a dog
James Cocker & Sons, a nursery business located in Aberdeen, Scotland
River Cocker, Cumbria, a river in the English county of Cumbria
River Cocker (Lancashire), a river in the English county of Lancashire

See also 
 

English-language surnames